Shorea kuantanensis is a species of plant in the family Dipterocarpaceae. It is a tree endemic to Peninsular Malaysia. It is threatened by habitat loss.

References

kuantanensis
Endemic flora of Peninsular Malaysia
Trees of Peninsular Malaysia
Critically endangered flora of Asia
Taxonomy articles created by Polbot